Anacortes School District No. 103 is a public school district in Skagit County, Washington and serves the city of Anacortes.

Justin Irish is superintendent of schools.

In October 2006, the district has an enrollment of 2,955.

Schools

High schools
Anacortes High School
Notable Alumni - Craig Bartlett, Rien Long, Phil Elverum, Bret Lunsford of "Beat Happening"
Cap Sante High School (Alternative school)

Middle schools
Anacortes Middle School

Elementary schools
Fidalgo Elementary School K-5
Island View Elementary School  K-5
Mount Erie Elementary School K-5
Whitney Elementary School Preschool and Kindergarten

Special Schools and Programs
Anacortes Home Education Partnership

References

External links
Anacortes School District No. 103
Anacortes School District Report Card

School districts in Washington (state)
School District
Education in Skagit County, Washington